Junonia sophia, the little commodore or little pansy, is a butterfly in the family Nymphalidae. It is found in Senegal, the Gambia, Guinea-Bissau, Guinea, Sierra Leone, Liberia, Ivory Coast, Burkina Faso, Ghana, Togo, Nigeria, Cameroon, Angola, the Democratic Republic of the Congo, Uganda, Rwanda, Burundi, Kenya, Ethiopia, Tanzania, Malawi, and Zambia. The habitat consists of forests and savanna.

The larvae feed on Paulowilhelmia sclerochiton, Hypoestes verticillaris, Brillantaisa lamium, Sclerochiton paulowilhelmina, Asystasia, Barleria, Justicia, and Ruellia species.

Subspecies
Junonia sophia sophia — Senegal, the Gambia, Guinea-Bissau, Guinea, Sierra Leone, Liberia, Ivory Coast, Burkina Faso, Ghana, Togo, Nigeria, Cameroon
Junonia sophia infracta Butler, 1888 — Angola, Democratic Republic of the Congo, eastern Uganda, Rwanda, Burundi, western and central Kenya, Ethiopia, Tanzania, Malawi, northern Zambia

References

sophia
Butterflies of Africa
Butterflies described in 1793